1992 Urawa Red Diamonds season

Team name
Club nameMitsubishi Urawa Football Club
NicknameRed Diamonds

Review and events

Competitions

Domestic results

Emperor's Cup

J.League Cup

Player statistics

Transfers

In:

Out:

Transfers during the season

In
none

Out
none

References

Other pages
 J. League official site
 Urawa Red Diamonds official site

Urawa Red Diamonds
Urawa Red Diamonds seasons